CityDance Ensemble was founded in 1996 and was a contemporary repertory dance company based in Washington, D.C. and North Bethesda, Maryland. The company was disbanded in 2011 and the founder and Artistic Director, Paul Emerson departed. CityDance Ensemble, now is composed of three other divisions: an outreach education arm that teaches and performs to over 25,000 students annually, the CityDance Center at Strathmore in North Bethesda, Maryland, and OnStage, a program that brings companies to the region's performance venues and supports emerging artists to create and present original work.  CityDance is directed by Executive Director Alexandra Nowakowski. The organization's studio education division and Conservatory program is led by Lorraine Audeoud Spiegler.

CityDance Ensemble was described as "Washington's preeminent modern dance company." In 2003, the company was named one of Dance Magazine's "25 to Watch".  FilmWORKS was awarded the 2005 Washington, D.C. Mayor's Arts Award for Innovation in the Arts in January 2006. The Washington Post praised the company in 2007, saying "finally, we have a home-grown modern dance company that can compete with the best."

CityDance Ensemble, the dance company, performed dances by choreographers from around the world. Using three signature series, the company kept both historic and cutting edge choreography on the stage throughout its concert season.

The Legacy Series reconstructed great and significant works of modern dance from the first 100 years of modern dance's history. In 2007 the company was awarded a prestigious "American Masterpieces: Dance" grant by the New England Foundation for the Arts to re-stage "Folksay," a dance made in 1942 by the late Sophie Maslow. Set to a score by Woody Guthrie, "Folksay" is considered among the most significant modern dances of the period. CityDance has also staged "Dust Bowl Ballads," by Maslow. "Dust Bowl Ballads" reflects upon the American Experience during the 1930s dust bowl which swept through many parts of the American Midwest, causing the dust bowl migration made famous by John Steinbeck's "Grapes of Wrath." Also in the Legacy Series canon is "Harmonica Breakdown" by Jane Dudley. A 1938 work set to the "Harmonica and Washboard Blues" by Sonny Terry and Oh Red, "Harmonica Breakdown" is 4 minute solo work.

CityDance Ensemble operates a school for the study of dance. The CityDance Center at Strathmore is located in the state-of-the-art Music Center at Strathmore in suburban Maryland. CityDance is also the dance education partner at the prestigious Madeira School for girls in McLean, Virginia, directing the dance education programming at Madeira.

CityDance Community Programs is the company's education division, with extensive year-round after-school programs for children throughout the Washington, D.C. area. The program has a special emphasis on at-risk students in the District of Columbia, and partners with the NBA Washington Wizards, The D.C. Commission on the Arts and Humanities, the Children and Youth Investment Trust Corporation and others to bring the art and joy of dance, literacy and social skills to elementary and middle school children year-round.

CityDance is also working aggressively towards becoming a "green" dance organization, focusing on reducing the company's carbon footprint, building awareness of climate issues, and partnering with other organizations both in the arts world and in government and industry to develop sustainable practices in its concerts, travels and daily operations. The company's lead partner in this effort is the World Wide Fund for Nature.

CityDance is in partnership with many of the Washington areas leading arts organizations, including Washington Performing Arts, the Harman Center for the Arts, home of the Shakespeare Theatre Company, the Music Center at Strathmore, the Baltimore Symphony Orchestra, and the Levine School of Music. These partnerships expand the opportunities for dance in the Washington area, and for collaborations between music and dance.

Gallery

References

External links
CityDance Ensemble
CityDance stages own 'return', The Washington Times, June 17, 2007

Dance companies in the United States
Dance in Washington, D.C.
Dance in Maryland